Giulio Antonio Santoro (1580 – 28 September 1638) was a Roman Catholic prelate who served as Archbishop of Cosenza (1624–1638).

Biography
Giulio Antonio Santoro was born in Caserta, Italy.
On 29 January 1624, he was appointed during the papacy of Pope Urban VIII as Archbishop of Cosenza.
On 4 February 1624, he was consecrated bishop by Giovanni Garzia Mellini, Cardinal-Priest of Santi Quattro Coronati, with Alessandro di Sangro, Archbishop of Benevento, and Agostino Morosini, Titular Archbishop of Damascus, serving as co-consecrators. 
He served as Archbishop of Cosenza until his death on 28 September 1638. 
While bishop, he was the principal co-consecrator of Consalvo Caputo, Bishop of San Marco (1630).

References

External links and additional sources
 (for Chronology of Bishops) 
 (for Chronology of Bishops) 

17th-century Italian Roman Catholic archbishops
Bishops appointed by Pope Urban VIII
1580 births
1638 deaths